港区 or 港區 may refer to:
Several places in Japan named :
Minato, Tokyo or Minato City, a special ward in Tokyo, Japan
Minato-ku, Nagoya, a ward of Nagoya, Japan
Minato-ku, Osaka, a ward of Osaka, Japan
The Hong Kong Special Administrative Region (HKSAR), especially in several contexts relating to the PRC:
The Hong Kong national security law
Hong Kong members of the National Committee of the Chinese People's Political Consultative Conference
Hong Kong delegates of the National People's Congress

See also
Minato (disambiguation)